L'Histoire is a monthly mainstream French magazine dedicated to historical studies, recognized by peers as the most important historical popular magazine (as opposed to specific university journals or less scientific popular historical magazines).

L'Histoire was founded by Michel Winock. Jean-Noël Jeanneney, president of the National Library of France since 2002, and Jean-Michel Gaillard are part of the editorial board. Many historians who write for L'Histoire also teach at the Paris Institute of Political Studies, better known as Sciences Po.

External links 
L'Histoire website
Reports appeared in the magazine : interactive index authors

1978 establishments in France
Magazines published in France
French-language magazines
History magazines
Magazines established in 1978
Monthly magazines published in France